The Mainz Basin or Rhine-Main Basin is the name given to a Cenozoic marine basin that covered the area of the present-day region of Rhenish Hesse in Germany about 38 to 12 million years ago (38 - 12 mya). The Mainz Basin was a bay or sea inlet, that for a short time in the Palaeogene period connected the then North Sea (part of the gradually widening North Atlantic during the Palaeogene) with the Paratethys Sea (part of the shrinking Tethys Ocean).

See also
Mainz Sand Dunes
Paris Basin

Notes

References 
Falke: Geologischer Führer von Rheinhessen. 1960
Klaus Hang: Das Rheinhessische Hügelland für Naturfreunde. In: Kosmos 1974
E. Probst: Deutschland in der Urzeit. München, 1986
D. Vogellehner: Paläontologie. Freiburg, 1987

Drainage basins of Germany
Geology of Germany
Regions of Rhineland-Palatinate